Oddbjørn Sverre Blindheim (born 24 February 1944 in Ålesund, Norway) is a jazz pianist and dentist from Vigra, the older brother of jazz bassist Svein Olav Blindheim, and a veteran on the Norwegian jazz scene.

Biography 
Blindheim started playing the piano as a teenager, when he rudely awakened to Bud Powell and Horace Silver. He finished dental studies in Oslo, and actively participated in the capital jazz scene during his studies. Over the years, he kept in touch with the jazz community and playing at times with touring musicians as well as with his own trio. As pianist, arranger and interpreter of beads from the jazz history, he is loud voice at the Norwegian jazz scene. With his trio he released the album Horace Hello (1999) is a tribute to Horace Silver with his brother Svein Olav on upright bass and drummer Håkon Mjåset Johansen. It received rave reviews in the international press, presenting compositions of some key jazz pianists from 1950–1960. Blindheim is influenced by some of the key jazz pianists from 1950–1960 like Thelonious Monk, Bud Powell, Horace Silver, Bobby Timmons, Randy Weston, Ray Bryant, Vic Feldman, Sonny Clark and Jan Johansson. Blindheim's latest album Piano Pals (2014) with bassist Bjørn Alterhaug and drummer Eyvind Olsen Wahlen, where he finds inspiration in The Golden Age of Modern Jazz, the 1950s and the 1960s.

Discography 
1999: Horace Hello (Gemini Records)
2014: Piano Pals (Ponca Jazz Records)

References

External links 
Smålåten sunnmøring trygt plantet mellom pasient og piano at Tannlegetidende.no 

20th-century Norwegian pianists
21st-century Norwegian pianists
Norwegian jazz pianists
Norwegian jazz composers
Gemini Records artists
Ponca Jazz Records artists
Musicians from Ålesund
1944 births
Living people